Edward O. Thorp's Real Blackjack is a 1990 video game published by Villa Crespo Software.

Gameplay
Edward O. Thorp's Real Blackjack is a game in which Edward O. Thorp serves as the player's expert guide in learning how to play blackjack better.

Reception
Michael S. Lasky reviewed the game for Computer Gaming World, and stated that "It is singularly one of the best casino game/tutorials available today."

Harry Bee for Compute! said the game "doesn't look as slick or play as simply as card games that focus on entertainment. It's substantial enough to take as lightly or seriously as you like."

References

1990 video games
Blackjack video games
DOS games
DOS-only games
Video games based on real people
Video games developed in the United States